Alexander Alexandrovich Vishnevsky (Kazan – 19 December 1975, Moscow) was a Soviet surgeon, member of the Academy of Medical Sciences of the USSR (1953), honoured worker of science of the RSFSR (1956), Colonel General of Medical Corps (1966), and a Hero of Socialist Labor (1966). Vishnevsky first conducted a cardiac surgery under the local anesthesia (1953).

A son of Alexandr Vasilyevich Vishnevsky, he elaborated the new methods for treating gunshot wounds treatment on the Eastern Front of World War II, such as using leeches to remove shrapnel. Later he was awarded several Soviet and foreign awards and prizes.

Works
Selected works on surgery and adjacent branches, vol. 1–2 (Избранные работы по хирургии и пограничным областям. Т. 1–2. М., 1970)
Surgeon's Diary. The Great Patriotic War 1941–1945, 2nd ed. (Дневник хирурга. Великая Отечественная война 1941–1945 гг. Изд. 2-е. М., 1970)

References
Советская военная энциклопедия, том 2
Great Soviet Encyclopedia

Soviet military doctors
Academicians of the USSR Academy of Medical Sciences
Soviet surgeons
Soviet anesthesiologists
Soviet military personnel of World War II
1906 births
1975 deaths
Heroes of Socialist Labour
Soviet inventors
Soviet colonel generals
Recipients of the Order of Lenin
Recipients of the Order of the Red Banner
Recipients of the USSR State Prize
Lenin Prize winners